The Saturn Award for Best Director  (or Saturn Award for Best Direction) is one of the annual awards given by the American Academy of Science Fiction, Fantasy & Horror Films. The Saturn Awards, which are the oldest film-specialized awards to reward genre fiction achievements, in particular for science fiction, fantasy, and horror (the Hugo Award for Best Dramatic Presentation is the oldest award for science fiction and fantasy films), included the Best Director category for the first time at the 3rd Saturn Awards, for the 1974/1975 film years.

History
The award is also the oldest to honor film directors in science fiction, fantasy and horror. It has been given 36 times, including a tie for the 1977 film year.

James Cameron holds the record of the most wins with five (for six nominations), while Steven Spielberg is the most nominated director with fourteen nominations (for four wins). Only three other directors have won the award more than once: Peter Jackson (three times), Bryan Singer and Ridley Scott (two times). At the 22nd Saturn Awards (for the 1995 film year), Kathryn Bigelow became the first woman to win the award, 15 years before becoming the first woman to win the Academy Award for Best Director.

Spielberg was also the first to win Best Director from both the Saturn Awards and the Academy Awards at the same year, but for different movies (Saturn Award for Jurassic Park, and Academy Award for Schindler's List, both in 1993); Peter Jackson was the first to win both for the same film (The Lord of the Rings: The Return of the King, in 2003) while Alfonso Cuarón was the second (for Gravity in 2013).

Winners and nominees

1970s

1980s

1990s

2000s

2010s

2020s

Multiple nominations
14 nominations
 Steven Spielberg

8 nominations
 Bryan Singer

7 nominations
 Peter Jackson
 Robert Zemeckis

6 nominations
 J. J. Abrams
 James Cameron
 Christopher Nolan

5 nominations
 Tim Burton
 Guillermo del Toro

4 nominations
 George Lucas
 Sam Raimi
 Matt Reeves
 Ridley Scott
 Quentin Tarantino
 Paul Verhoeven

3 nominations
 John Badham
 Kathryn Bigelow
 Alfonso Cuarón
 Joe Dante
 William Dear
 Clint Eastwood
 David Fincher
 Terry Gilliam
 Ron Howard
 George Miller
 Jordan Peele
 Anthony and Joe Russo
 David Yates

2 nominations
 Woody Allen
 Chris Columbus
 David Cronenberg
 Frank Darabont
 Roland Emmerich
 Jon Favreau
 William Friedkin
 Rian Johnson
 Randal Kleiser
 Ang Lee
 Frank Marshall
 Nicholas Meyer
 Leonard Nimoy
 Alex Proyas
 Guy Ritchie
 Martin Scorsese
 Zack Snyder
 Denis Villeneuve
 Peter Weir
 John Woo
 Zhang Yimou

Multiple wins
5 wins
 James Cameron

4 wins
 Steven Spielberg

3 wins
 Peter Jackson

2 wins
 J. J. Abrams
 Ridley Scott
 Bryan Singer

References

Director
Awards established in 1974
Awards established in 1975